The Car Nicobar class of high-speed offshore patrol vessels are built by Garden Reach Shipbuilders and Engineers (GRSE) for the Indian Navy. The vessels are designed as a cost-effective platform for patrol, anti-piracy and rescue operations in India's exclusive economic zone.

The class and its vessels are named for Indian islands. They are the first water jet-propelled vessels of the Indian Navy.

Design
The Car Nicobar-class vessels were designed and built by GRSE. Production of the class was fast tracked after the 2008 Mumbai attacks. The vessels feature improved habitability with fully air-conditioned modular accommodation, on board reverse osmosis plant for desalination, and a sewage treatment plant.

The vessels are each powered by three HamiltonJet HM811 water jets, coupled with MTU 16V 4000 M90 engines, delivering a combined  of power. An aluminium superstructure reduces weight and is designed to reduce radar cross-section.

As patrol vessels, they are lightly armed. They carry various sensors, including the Furuno navigation radar and sonar. Armament on board includes a 30 mm CRN-91 automatic cannon with an electronic day-night fire control system of Ordnance Factory Board (OFB) and Bharat Electronics Limited (BEL) origin. The vessels also mount two 12.7 mm heavy machine guns (HMG) and multiple medium machine guns, besides carrying shoulder-launched Igla surface-to-air missiles to combat aerial threats.

The first two vessels commissioned were initially restricted to speeds up to  due to deficiency in the gearboxes, which was later rectified by KPCL. The improved maneuverability and speed allows these vessels to have high-speed interdiction of fast-moving targets.

The last four ships are an improved variant of the Car Nicobar-class patrol boats and have been dubbed 'follow on waterjet fast attack craft' (FOWJFAC) by the Indian Navy. Improvements include an enhanced electrical power generation capacity of 280 kW and twice the reverse osmosis (RO) capacity at 4 tonnes per day.

Vessels

Operations
INS Car Nicobar and INS Chetlat are based in Chennai under India's Eastern Naval Command.

INS Cankarso and INS Kondul are based in Goa under the Western Naval Command.

INS Kalpeni is based in Kochi under the Southern Naval Command.

Operation Island Watch
In January 2011, as a part of Operation Island Watch, INS Cankarso and INS Kalpeni were deployed on anti-piracy patrol to the west of the Lakshadweep archipelago. On 28 January, Cankarso responded to a Mayday call from a container ship. Upon reaching the site, she saw Somali pirate skiffs being hoisted aboard a hijacked Thai fishing trawler, Prantalay 14, which was being used as a pirate mother ship.

Cankarso ordered the pirated ship to stop for inspection. The pirates on board fired on Cankarso as they tried to flee west towards Somalia. Cankarso returned the fire, which hit some of the fuel drums stored on Prantalay 14s deck for refuelling the skiffs. The mother ship was set ablaze and sank, even as Kalpeni and an Indian Coast Guard patrol vessel, ICGS Sankalp, reached the site. 15 pirates were arrested, and the 20 crew of the fishing trawler were all rescued unharmed.

In another operation on 13 March 2011, an Indian Navy patrol aircraft spotted the Mozambique-registered fishing vessel, Vega 5, when responding to a merchant ship reporting a pirate attack. Beira-based Vega 5, owned by Spanish company Pescamar Lda, had been captured on 27 December 2010 by pirates who were demanding US$1.8 million in ransom. A fire broke out on the vessel when Kalpeni returned fired after being fired upon by the pirates. 61 pirates were rescued and arrested after they jumped into the Arabian Sea to escape the fire. The crew of Kalpeni put out the fire on board Vega 5, rescued her 13 crew members and escorted her to Mumbai. Rocket-propelled grenades and over 80 assault rifles were recovered from the pirates.

See also
 List of active Indian Navy ships

References

External links

 Car Nicobar Class – Bharat Rakshak
 INS Chetlat launched at GRSE
 New age ship for patrol
 GRSE launches two modern warships for Indian Navy

Video
 INS Cankarso - Comprehensive Review by Autocar India
 Indian Navy adds new warships

Images
 Commissioning ceremony of INS Kora Divh and INS Cheriyam
 Governor taking salute during commissioning ceremony
 INS Car Nicobar during commissioning ceremony
 INS Chetlat during commissioning ceremony

 
Ships built in India
Patrol boat classes